Ketaki Dutta was an actor of Bengali theatre and films. She was also a singer.

Chapal Bhaduri is one of her siblings.

Career 

Dutta was in the theatre profession from childhood.

Filmography

Bibliography 
Ketaki Dutta: in her own words and fragmentary pieces – Samik Bandyopadhyay -

References 

2003 deaths
Bengali actresses
Actresses from Kolkata
20th-century Indian actresses
Actresses in Bengali cinema
Recipients of the Sangeet Natak Akademi Award